Half-Life 2: Episode One is a 2006 first-person shooter game developed and published by Valve for Windows. It continues the story of Half-Life 2 (2004); as scientist Gordon Freeman, players must escape City 17 with Gordon's companion Alyx Vance. Like previous Half-Life games, Episode One combines shooting, puzzles and storytelling.

After the six-year development of Half-Life 2, Valve switched to episodic development, hoping to release games more frequently. For Episode One, they focused on developing the character of Alyx and expanded her artificial intelligence. It uses an updated version of Valve's Source engine, with new lighting and animation technology.

Episode One received mostly positive reviews; the co-operative gameplay with Alyx received particular praise, although the short length was criticized. It was ported to Xbox 360 and PlayStation 3 as part of the 2007 compilation The Orange Box. Episode Two followed in 2007.

Gameplay 

In Episode One, players make their way through a linear series of levels and encounter various enemies and allies. The gameplay is broken up between combat-oriented challenges and physics-based puzzles. Episode One integrates tutorial-like tasks into the story to familiarize the player with new gameplay mechanics without breaking immersion. A head-up display appears on the screen to display the character's health, energy, and ammunition. Throughout the course of the game, the player accesses new weapons and ammunition that are used to defend the character from enemy forces. Unlike in Half-Life 2, where Gordon's first weapon is the crowbar, Gordon first acquires the Gravity Gun, which plays a crucial role in the game by allowing the player to use physics to manipulate objects at a distance in both combat and puzzle-solving scenarios.

The artificial intelligence (AI) for Alyx Vance, Gordon's companion, was explicitly designed for co-operative play in Episode One to complement the player's abilities. The developers described Alyx's programming for Episode One as a "personality code" as opposed to an "AI code", emphasizing the attention they gave to make Alyx a unique and believable companion. For part of the code, she was explicitly programmed to avoid performing too many mechanical or repetitive actions, such as repeating lines of dialogue or performing certain routines in combat situations. Examples of this co-operative gameplay include combat in underground levels. In this scenario, the player can conserve their ammunition by using a flashlight to help Alyx spot and kill oncoming enemies. Similarly, Alyx will often take up strategic positions and provide covering fire to keep the player safe while they travel to a certain area or perform certain actions.

Plot 

In City 17, Gordon Freeman and his ally Alyx Vance have destroyed the reactor at the heart of the Combine Citadel. As it explodes, the G-Man intervenes and extracts Gordon. Several Vortigaunts appear and rescue Alyx from the blast. The Vortigaunts appear before the G-Man and stand between him and Gordon. They teleport Gordon away from the scene, restricting the effect of G-Man's abilities on Gordon.

Alyx's pet robot Dog retrieves Gordon from rubble outside the Citadel, and Gordon reunites with Alyx. Alyx contacts her father Eli Vance and scientist Isaac Kleiner, who have escaped the city. Kleiner tells them the Citadel's core will soon explode, which will completely wipe out City 17. Alyx and Gordon re-enter the Citadel and temporarily stabilize the core.

Alyx discovers that Combine Elite soldiers are accelerating the destruction of the Citadel to send a "transmission packet" to the Combine's homeworld. She downloads a copy of the message, along with a transmission from Dr. Judith Mossman, in which she mentions a "project" she has located, before she is cut off by a Combine attack.

Alyx and Gordon board a train to escape the Citadel, but it derails. They proceed on foot in the city streets, fighting through the disorganized Combine forces and rampant alien infestations. They meet Barney Calhoun and a group of other survivors who are preparing to move to a train station to escape City 17. Alyx and Gordon lead and escort the survivors to the station, as the way there is constantly being swarmed and sabotaged by Combine forces.

Alyx and Gordon take a different train out of City 17, escaping just as the reactor detonates and the Combine's message is transmitted. Several rocket pods containing Combine Advisors launch from the Citadel as it detonates. The resulting shockwave derails the train.

Development 
Valve developed Half-Life 2 (2004) over six years using its new game engine, Source. In April 2005, Valve announced an expansion for Half-Life 2 under the working title Aftermath. Designer Robin Walker said: "Right now, we're really, really good at making Half-Life 2 ... We'd just got comfortable with all our tools and what we could do. That's normally the point in which we'd go off and make new tools — we didn't want to do that." Valve president Gabe Newell said customers would be happier with a new Half-Life game delivered in a shorter time rather than "waiting six years for another monolithic product". 

In February 2006, Valve announced a new title for the expansion, Episode One. In May, Valve announced that Episode One was the first in a planned trilogy of episodic games to be released over the following two years. Newell said he considered the trilogy the equivalent of Half-Life 3. According to Newell, whereas the original Half-Life (1998) saw the G-Man transform Freeman into his tool, and Half-Life 2 saw Freeman being used by G-Man, the episodes would see G-Man lose control.

While the plots and dialogue of Half-Life and Half-Life 2 had been written solely by Marc Laidlaw, the Half-Life 2 episodes were written by Laidlaw and new employees Chet Faliszek and Erik Wolpaw. Valve's focus was character development, particularly that of Gordon's companion Alyx, who accompanies the player for almost the entire game. Walker said: "It's kind of ironic that despite so much of the theme of Half-Life 2 being about other characters and other people, you spent most of the game alone."

Because of Alyx's significant involvement, Valve made modifications to her AI that allowed her to react to the player's actions. Changes include commentating on objects the player manipulates or obstacles they have overcome. She also acts as an essential device in both plot exposition and directing the player's journey, often vocalizing what the player is required to do next to progress. The developers explained that a large part of their focus was creating not only a believable companion for the player, but also one that did not obstruct the player's actions. They wanted to allow the player to dictate his/her own pace and method of overcoming any challenges faced without being hindered. This meant that Valve often had to scale back Alyx's input and dialogue during the player's journey so they would not feel pressured to progress and consequently object to her presence. The developers also placed what they described as "hero moments" throughout the game, which allow the player to single-handedly overcome obstacles such as particularly challenging enemies, during which Alyx takes the role of an observer and gives the player praise and adulation for their feats. The game was extensively playtested so that Valve could gauge its effectiveness and difficulty.

Episode One was made with an upgraded version of Source, with more advanced lighting effects and a new version of its facial animation/expression technology. Upgrades to enemy AI allow Combine soldiers to use tactics previously unavailable to them. For example, Combine soldiers were given the ability to crouch while being fired upon so they could duck underneath the player's line of fire. The soundtrack was composed by Kelly Bailey. The music is used sparingly; it plays primarily during scenes of major plot developments or particularly important action sequences such as large battles or when encountering a new enemy.

While no new locales were introduced in Episode One, extensive alterations were made to the appearance of both City 17 where the game takes place and the Citadel from the end of Half-Life 2 to reflect the changing shape of the world and remind the player that their actions have major effects on the storyline. The Citadel has degenerated from the cold, alien, and imposing fortress of the previous game into an extremely unstable state. This provides a visual cue to the player of the catastrophic damage they inflicted, and it allows for the introduction of new gameplay elements that accentuate the dangers which come with the Citadel's imminent collapse. It also serves a thematic purpose by highlighting the weakening of the Combine's dominance in City 17. Likewise, City 17 has been altered to reflect the aftermath of the resistance's open rebellion, with vast swathes of destroyed buildings, and the introduction of foes previously kept outside its confines in Half-Life 2 to emphasize the scale of the uprising.

Release 
Episode One was sold in both retail stores and Valve's online Steam distribution system, where it was sold at a discount price. The game was also distributed by Electronic Arts as a standalone release. It was available for pre-load and pre-purchase through Steam on May 1, 2006, with Half-Life Deathmatch: Source and Half-Life 2: Deathmatch immediately available for play as part of the package. Episode One was rereleased in the Valve compilation The Orange Box for Mac, PC, Xbox 360, and PlayStation 3. About 1.4 million retail copies of Episode One had been sold by 2008.

Reception 
Response to Episode One was generally positive, and reviewers praised the game for having more intricate, well-paced gameplay than Half-Life 2. The game's interactivity, particularly in the form of Alyx and her reactions to the player's actions and the events of the game, was also singled out for praise. PC Gamer commented that "while this inaugural episode may not be the essential FPS that Half-Life 2 is, I can't imagine any shooter fan who'd want to miss it." In its review, PC Gamer directed particular praise to the balance between puzzle-oriented and action-oriented challenges throughout the game. In Australia, the magazine PC PowerPlay awarded the game 10 out of 10.

Edge praised the "deftness" with which the game was able to direct the player's eyes, and the strength of Alyx as a companion, concluding, "In an interactive genre bound to the traditions of the pop-up gun and invisible hero, it simply doesn't get more sophisticated than this." Episode One earned scores of 87/100 and 85.59% on review aggregators Metacritic and GameRankings respectively. IGN awarded Episode One "Best PC FPS of 2006" and described it as a "great bang for the buck using Valve's new episodic plan", although it did not offer "the complete experience that Half-Life 2 was". GameSpy ranked Episode One ninth on its 2006 "Games of the Year" list, and it also noted the implementation of Alyx as a believable and useful companion.

A common criticism of the game is its short length. Episode One takes roughly 4–6 hours to complete, which raised the issue of whether the game justified its price. Computer Games Magazine argued the futility of reviewing the game due to its episodic nature; as the first part of a three-part story arc, it is difficult to judge it when divorced from the final product. Game Revolution expressed disappointment at a lack of new features such as environments and weapons.

Sequels 
Half-Life 2: Episode Two was released in 2007. Episode Three was scheduled for release by Christmas 2007, but was canceled as Valve found the episodic model contrary to their growing ambition for new instalments. After canceling several further Half-Life projects, Valve released a prequel, Half-Life: Alyx, in 2020.

References

External links 

  (The Orange Box)

2006 video games
Dystopian video games
Episodic video games
First-person shooters
Half-Life (series)
Linux games
MacOS games
PlayStation 3 games
Fiction about rebellions
Science fiction video games
Single-player video games
Source (game engine) games
Valve Corporation games
Video games developed in the United States
Video games scored by Kelly Bailey
Video games set in the 2020s
Video games set in Eastern Europe
Video games using Havok
Video game sequels
Video games with commentaries
Windows games
Xbox 360 games
Video games about zombies